A dilemma is a double proposition in logics.

Dilemma may also refer to:

Geography
 Dilemma Geyser, Yellowstone National Park, United States
 Dilemma Glacier, New Zealand

Arts, entertainment, and media 
 The Dilemma (1914 film), a silent movie
 Dilemmas (1954), a collection of short pieces by the British philosopher, Gilbert Ryle (1900–1976)
 Dilemma (1962 Danish film), a Danish film based on the apartheid novel 'A World of Strangers' 
 Dilemma (1962 British film), a British crime film starring Peter Halliday
 Dilemma (novel), a 1999 novel by Jon Cleary
 "Dilemma" (song), a 2002 song performed by Nelly and Kelly Rowland
 The Dilemma (2011), a comedy film
 "Dilemma" (Apink song), a 2022 song performed by Apink
 "Dilemma" (Death Grips song), a 2018 song performed by Death Grips

See also
 
 Lemma (disambiguation)
 Tetralemma
 Trilemma